"Baba O'Riley" is a song by the English rock band the Who, and the opening track to their fifth album Who's Next (1971). It was issued in Europe as a single on 23 October 1971, coupled with "My Wife".

Roger Daltrey sings most of the song, with Pete Townshend singing the middle eight: "Don't cry/ don't raise your eye/ it's only teenage wasteland".

"Baba O'Riley" appears in Time magazine's "All-Time 100 Songs" list, Rolling Stones list of "The 500 Greatest Songs of All Time", and the Rock and Roll Hall of Fame as one of the 500 Songs That Shaped Rock and Roll.

It also features on live albums: Who's Last, Live from Royal Albert Hall, Live from Toronto, and Greatest Hits Live. The original recording's violin solo is played on harmonica by Daltrey when performed live.

Title
The song is often incorrectly referred to as "Teenage Wasteland", due to these oft-repeated words in the song's chorus refrain. "Teenage Wasteland" was in fact a working title for the song in its early incarnations as part of the Lifehouse project, but eventually became the title for a different but related song by Townshend, which is slower and features different lyrics. A demo of "Teenage Wasteland" features in Lifehouse Chronicles, a six-disc set of music related to the Lifehouse project, and in several Townshend compilations and videos.

The song's title refers to two of Townshend's major inspirations at the time: Meher Baba, and Terry Riley.

Background and composition
Townshend originally wrote "Baba O'Riley" for his Lifehouse project, a rock opera intended as the follow-up to the Who's 1969 opera, Tommy. In Lifehouse, a Scottish farmer named Ray would have sung the song at the beginning as he gathered his wife Sally and his two children to begin their exodus to London. When Lifehouse was scrapped, eight of the songs were salvaged and recorded for the Who's 1971 album Who's Next, with "Baba O'Riley" as the lead-off track.

According to Townshend, at the end of the band's gig at the 1969 Isle of Wight Festival, the field was covered in rubbish left by fans, which inspired the line "teenage wasteland". In another interview, Townshend stated the song was also inspired by "the absolute desolation of teenagers at Woodstock, where audience members were strung out on acid and 20 people had brain damage. The irony was that some listeners took the song to be a teenage celebration: 'Teenage Wasteland, yes! We're all wasted!'"

Recording and release
The repeating set of notes (known technically as ostinato) in "Baba O'Riley" that opens and underlies the  song was derived from the Lifehouse concept, where Townshend wanted to input the vital signs and personality of Meher Baba into a synthesiser, which would then generate music based on that data. When this idea fell through, Townshend instead recorded a Lowrey Berkshire Deluxe TBO-1 organ using its marimba repeat feature to generate them. This modal approach was inspired by the work of minimalist composer Terry Riley.

The song was derived from a nine-minute demo, which the band reconstructed. "Baba O'Riley" was initially 30 minutes in length, but was edited down to the "high points" of the track for Who's Next. The other parts of the song appeared on the third disc of Townshend's Lifehouse Chronicles as "Baba M1 (O'Riley 1st Movement 1971)" and "Baba M2 (2nd Movement Part 1 1971)". Dave Arbus, whose band East of Eden was recording in the same studio, was invited by Keith Moon to play the violin solo during the outro.  In most live performances, this part is played instead by Daltrey on harmonica.  

"Baba O'Riley" was released in November 1971, as a single in several European countries. However, in the United Kingdom and the United States, it was released only as part of the album Who's Next.  The song, however, became one of the band's most popular songs, as well as a popular staple of AOR radio, and remains on the classic rock radio canon.

Reception and legacy

"Baba O'Riley" appears at No. 159 on Rolling Stones list of "The 500 Greatest Songs of All Time". The song is in the Rock and Roll Hall of Fame as one of the 500 Songs That Shaped Rock and Roll. The band Pearl Jam regularly plays a cover of the song during concerts, and a readers' poll in Rolling Stone awarded this cover as #8 in their Greatest Live Cover Songs.

"Baba O'Riley" was used as the theme song for the popular television series CSI: NY (2004–13); with each CSI series using a Who song as its theme. The song was also used in the One Tree Hill episode "Pictures of You" (season 4, episode 13). The live version of the song from the album Who's Last plays in the opening segment of the Miami Vice episode "Out Where the Buses Don't Run" (season two, 1985). One of the working titles of That '70s Show (1998–2006) was "Teenage Wasteland," a reference to the repeated lyric in the song. The song was also used in the trailers for the films A Bug's Life (1998), American Beauty (1999), Resident Evil: Retribution (2012), Jobs (2013), The Peanuts Movie (2015), Free Guy (2021) and Season 3 of Stranger Things. "Baba O'Riley" was included in the soundtrack for the 1997 film Prefontaine and the 1999 film Summer of Sam. The song was used in the 10th episode of the 2010 FOX show The Good Guys. The song was featured heavily in the 2004 romantic comedy film The Girl Next Door, and was also used in the beginning of, and the end credits of, the 2012 movie Premium Rush.
The song has also been used in episode 14 of season one in the TV series House and in episode 10 of season one in the TV series The Newsroom. It was also used in episode one of the UK version of Life on Mars. A remixed version of this song, re-done by Alan Wilkis, appears in the 2012 remake of Need for Speed: Most Wanted, as well as the Family Guy season 13 episode "Quagmire's Mom", the third Robot Chicken: Star Wars special and episode 11 of season one of Superstore. The song is featured in an episode of Joe Pera Talks with You, "Joe Pera Reads You the Church Announcements", in which Pera is unable to contain his excitement after hearing the song for the first time in his life. The song is also sung in the first season Sense8 episode "W. W. N. Double D?" by Riley's dad at the airport.

In October 2001, the Who gave a much lauded performance of the song at the Concert for New York City. Since 2003, "Baba O'Riley" has been played during player introductions for the Los Angeles Lakers during home games at the Staples Center. The song is played before live UFC events during a highlight package showing some of the most famous fights in the mixed martial arts company's history. The song was even used for the trailer of the EA SPORTS UFC 4 game. It is also the official theme song of competitive eater Joey Chestnut.

At both the opening and closing ceremonies of the 2012 London Olympics, the 120 bpm dance track "The Road Goes on Forever" by High Contrast, which samples "Baba O'Riley", is used during the countdown at the start of the proceedings. "Baba O'Riley" was then performed by the Who as their first number during the last musical segment at the closing ceremony, with Daltrey singing a changed lyric of "Don't cry/Just raise your eye/There's more than teenage wasteland". "Baba O'Riley" is also used as the pregame music at Sanford Stadium and is played right before kickoff at every University of Georgia home football game. In addition, the Boston College Marching Band have featured a rendition of the song at football and hockey games.  It is also played at halftime of most New England Patriots home games, leading up to the second-half kickoff. It is also the entrance music for the New York Rangers at Madison Square Garden for every time the Rangers in the playoffs home game.

In the course of a debate on Twitter, it was noted that "Best Song Ever" (2013) by One Direction bore a strong resemblance to the basic structure of "Baba O'Riley". Pete Townshend responded to the claims by denying that the Who were pursuing legal action, and stated that he was a fan of One Direction's single and was happy that One Direction appeared to have been influenced by the Who, just as he had been influenced by earlier musicians such as Eddie Cochran.

Personnel

The Who 
 Roger Daltrey – lead vocals, harmonica (live versions only)
 Pete Townshend – Lowrey organ, piano, guitar, co-lead vocals
 John Entwistle – bass
 Keith Moon – drums

Additional personnel 
 Dave Arbus – violin

Charts

Certifications

References

External links

  – filmed at Shepperton Studios, on 25 May 1978, in front of an invited audience, and included in Jeff Stein's documentary The Kids Are Alright

The Who songs
Songs written by Pete Townshend
1971 songs
1971 singles
Song recordings produced by Glyn Johns
CSI: NY
Decca Records singles
Polydor Records singles
MCA Records singles
Television drama theme songs
Song recordings produced by Pete Townshend
Songs based on actual events
Songs about teenagers
Teenage tragedy songs
Electronic rock songs
Meher Baba
Terry Riley